Ruppia bicarpa is an aquatic plant species in the genus Ruppia of Ruppiaceae. It is found in shallow waters.

Distribution and habitat
Known only from Western Cape, South Africa.

References

Brackish water plants
bicarpa